Kutanabad (also Romanized as Kūtānābād) is a village in Qatur Rural District, Qatur District, Khoy County, West Azerbaijan Province, Iran. At the 2006 census, its population was 549, in 107 families.

References 

Populated places in Khoy County